Rich Ryerson is a former U.S. soccer midfielder who spent three seasons in the American Professional Soccer League, one in the National Professional Soccer League, one in the Eastern Indoor Soccer League and four in the Continental Indoor Soccer League.  He also played in the Swedish second division and was the head coach for the UNLV Rebels men's soccer team for eleven years.

Youth
Ryerson, brother to Rob Ryerson attended Oakland Mills High School.  He then attended UNLV where he played on the men’s soccer team from 1983 to 1986.  He finished his career holding the school’s records with 84 career games.  He graduated in 1987 with a bachelor's degree in business administration.

Professional
In 1990, Ryerson played for the California Emperors in the American Professional Soccer League.  The Emperors folded at the end of the season and Ryerson spent time with two teams, the Maryland Bays and Salt Lake Sting during the 1991 APSL season.  In 1993, he played twenty games with the Los Angeles Salsa of APSL, losing to the Colorado Foxes in the league championship.

In 1993, Ryerson was with the Los Angeles Heat of the APSL.  On October 28, 1993, the Heat loaned Ryerson to the Cleveland Crunch of the National Professional Soccer League.  In the summer of 1994, Ryerson played for the San Jose Grizzlies of the Continental Indoor Soccer League (CISL).  In 1995, he moved to the Washington Warthogs before ending the season back with the Grizzlies.  In 1996, he played for the Indianapolis Twisters.  At the end of the season, the Twisters were renamed the Indiana Twisters.  Ryerson began the season with Indiana, but suffered a concussion after only two games.  In July, the Twisters traded him and Terry Rowe to the Anaheim Splash in exchange for Paul McDonnel and a 1998 first round draft pick.  Ryerson had played only two games with Indiana this season due to a concussion.  In 1997, he also played for the U.S. national futsal team.  Ryerson  finished his career in 1998 with the Baton Rouge Bombers in the Eastern Indoor Soccer League where he was named the EISL Defender of the Year.  He also played for Kinna IF for two seasons in the Swedish Second Division in 1988-89.

Coach
Beginning in 1994, Ryerson served as an athletic director and physical education teacher for various schools in Rancho Mirage, California, namely Marywood-Palm Valley school.  On June 14, 2008, Ryerson became an assistant coach at the UNLV.

References

Living people
Soccer players from Maryland
American soccer coaches
American expatriate soccer players
American Professional Soccer League players
Anaheim Splash players
Baton Rouge Bombers players
California Emperors players
Cleveland Crunch players
Continental Indoor Soccer League players
Indiana Twisters players
Los Angeles Salsa players
Maryland Bays players
National Professional Soccer League (1984–2001) players
Salt Lake Sting players
San Jose Grizzlies players
UNLV Rebels men's soccer players
UNLV Rebels men's soccer coaches
Washington Warthogs players
American soccer players
Association football midfielders
Year of birth missing (living people)